The Broken Window is a crime thriller novel written by Jeffery Deaver, published in 2008. It is the eighth book in the Lincoln Rhyme series.

Plot
In the book, a killer has access to the world's greatest data miner called Strategic Systems Datacorp. He is using detailed information to commit crimes and blame them on innocents. Lincoln Rhyme, Amelia Sachs, and characters from the previous books, team up to stop the criminal.

Reception
Publishers Weekly reviewed the book saying "The topical subject matter makes the story line particularly compelling, while longtime fans will relish Deaver's intimate exploration of a tragedy from Rhyme's adolescence."
Entertainment Weekly reviewed the book saying "Quadriplegic forensics whiz Lincoln Rhyme and his Glock-toting girlfriend, Amelia Sachs, track a serial killer who uses an all-knowing computer database to frame fall guys. Movie Pitch: Ironside meets CSI and Enemy of the State. Bottom Line: Rhyme still intrigues in his eighth outing, while Deaver's scarily believable depiction of identity theft in a total-surveillance society stokes our paranoia. A -."
On July 6, 2008 The Broken Window was on The New York Times hardcover fiction best seller list.

External links
New York Times Hardcover Fiction Best Seller List For July 6, 2008

2008 American novels
Lincoln Rhyme (novel series)
Simon & Schuster books
Identity theft in popular culture